is a Japanese manga series written and illustrated by Q Hayashida. It was serialized in Shogakukan's manga magazines Monthly Ikki (November 2000 to September 2014), Hibana (March 2015 to August 2017), and Monthly Shōnen Sunday (November 2017 to September 2018); its chapters were collected in 23 tankōbon volumes. Dorohedoro tells the story of the amnesiac reptilian-headed Caiman, working together with his friend Nikaido to recover his memories and survive in a strange and violent world.

In North America, the series has been licensed for English-language release by Viz Media in 2009, which began distributing the manga digitally when it launched SigIKKI, the now defunct online English version of Ikki magazine. The twenty-three volumes were published from 2010 to 2019.

A 12-episode anime television series adaptation produced by MAPPA was broadcast in Japan on Tokyo MX from January to March 2020. It was followed by a worldwide streaming release on Netflix in May 2020.

Synopsis

Setting
The series is set in a near post-apocalyptic future, taking place across three distinct realms: Hole, a sprawling favela-like city inhabited by humans, heavily polluted from sorcerers' magic; the Sorcerers' world, a vibrant land filled with magic users and controlled by sorcerer crime boss En; and Hell, a torturous underworld occupied by all deceased sorcerers and ruled by demons, presided over by head demon Chidaruma.

Despite appearing similar, humans and sorcerers are two distinct species, the former evolving naturally while the latter originated from a primordial devil named Chidaruma. Sorcerers have a specialized circulatory system that allows them to produce "smoke", the source of their magical powers. Some sorcerers are capable of far greater feats than most, such as resurrecting the dead or controlling time; these powers are incredibly rare and highly prized. The amount of smoke a sorcerer is capable of producing determines the effectiveness of their magic abilities. Many sorcerers work to improve their smoke output through surgery, or more commonly, the illicit use of black powder, a smoke-enhancing drug distributed by criminals. Smoke can also be bought and sold similar to magic pawning, with sold magic retaining the effects it had when it is cast.

Both the magic realm and Hole are overwhelmingly lawless. Historically, Hole was run by violent community vigilantes who would torture and kill suspected sorcerers and their families. Since the vigilante groups have dissolved, Hole's inhabitants are largely helpless to stop sorcerers from experimenting on and killing them, to the point that specialist hospitals have to be run to save human victims of magic attacks. Additionally, the magic realm was previously run by traffickers who would drain sorcerers of magic for resale before dumping their bodies; En is one of the few surviving victims of this, ultimately tearing the empire down to establish himself as a ruling mob boss of the magic world.

The realms are structured not unlike a caste system: demons are highest ranked; deeply respected and revered by sorcerer-kind, they follow the bidding of Chidaruma. Within sorcerer-kind there is a hierarchical system wherein powerful magic users live in luxury selling their skills, while weaker sorcerers can live in abject poverty within their world. The lowest in the hierarchy are humans, forced to live in the slums of Hole surrounded by severe pollution and magic acid rain caused by sorcerers. In response to the abuses they endure, a number of weak sorcerers and humans form a gang called The Cross-Eyes, its members identifiable by red cross tattoos on their eyelids, and work to provide weaker peoples with illegal black powder and to oppose En's family.

Premise
A man named Caiman is searching for his real identity after a transformation by a sorcerer left him with a reptile's head and no memory of his former life. Along with his friend Nikaido, he violently assaults sorcerers in the Hole, with the aim of taking their heads into his mouth, where a strange face appears from his throat and judges whether the sorcerer he has bitten onto was the one responsible for his transformation or not. Somehow, Caiman is immune to magical effects and as a result is extremely dangerous to sorcerers, especially given his large size and proficiency with knives.

The news of a lizard-headed sorcerer-killer immune to magic attracts the attention of En, a powerful sorcerer and head of a syndicate known as “The En Family”, who sends his cleaners Shin and Noi to kill Caiman. En himself is currently attempting to scrub out a gang of low-level sorcerers known as the Cross-Eyes, after an encounter with their legendary boss almost cost him his life years ago. Shin and Noi regularly team up with low-ranking sorcerers Fujita, who seeks revenge as Caiman murdered his partner, and Ebisu, who has lost her memory after accidentally having her face torn off.

As the residents of the Hole, the En family and the Cross-Eyes gang, along with many others, collide with one another, the mystery of Caiman's identity begins to unravel, reigniting ancient grudges and threatening to forever change both the Hole and the sorcerers' world.

Characters

Residents of the Hole

Caiman is a victim of a magic attack that has left him with the head of a reptile and no memory of his original identity. He works with his friend Nikaido to hunt down Sorcerers who enter the Hole, hoping to find the one who cast the spell on him and kill him to nullify it. By biting down on the heads of Sorcerers, a mysterious presence that lives in his mouth communicates with the bewildered Sorcerer, stating whether or not they are "the one". Caiman then spits them out and asks the Sorcerer to repeat the information to him. This is his only lead to finding his original identity. Caiman's immunity to magic and formidable knife skills make him incredibly skilled at battling Sorcerers. He also has the ability to regenerate his head, allowing him to survive lethal attacks such as decapitation. When not fighting, Caiman loves eating gyoza and frequently sends Nikaido's restaurant, The Hungry Bug, teetering towards financial ruin due to his reluctance to pay his tab. While his imposing figure frightens some, he is generally well-liked in the Hole. At the beginning of the series, he works part time at a hospital for the treatment of magic victims.

Caiman's best friend and owner of the Hungry Bug, a restaurant in the Hole. She found Caiman after his initial transformation and helps him hunt down Sorcerers in the hopes of returning his memories and face. She is secretly a Sorcerer herself, and the only known Sorcerer capable of time manipulation. Unwilling to use her magic due to an incident in her youth, she fled to the Hole at a young age and has resided there ever since. Despite this, she has powerful contacts in the Sorcerer's world, namely a devil named Asu who was once raised alongside her. Nikaido is an incredibly skilled fighter in spite of not using magic, typically utilising hand-to-hand combat and acrobatics to disable foes.

A scientist who has studied Sorcerers intently for decades. He is approached by Caiman and Nikaido to use his artificial door to the Sorcerer's world. Although in his 60s, he looks incredibly young due to magic cast on him by his estranged, Sorcerer wife, Haru, who has since become a devil. His real name is Haze. He is frequently seen with his sidekick, Jonson. Kasukabe is one of the only characters who remembers Ai Coleman and played a pivotal role in Caiman's history.

A giant cockroach living in the sewers of the Hole who was mutated by the residual smoke in the Hole's polluted water. Jonson originally belonged to another resident of the Hole who was hunting down magic victims, but is later adopted by Professor Kasukabe and rarely leaves his side from then on. Kasukabe is able to control Jonson using specialised frequencies and can even make him talk, though he is only capable of saying "shocking".

The En Family

The leader of the En Family and a business magnate in the Sorcerer's world. He wears a mask that holds over his mouth similar to a surgeon's mask, and his smoke turns people and objects into mushrooms. He is also quite fond of mushrooms, so much so that he themes every product he sells after them, and tends to only eat mushrooms.
At a young age, En was sold to a group of low-level Sorcerers who ran a factory designed to forcefully extract smoke from Sorcerers. He was thrown away when he was nine, where he was found by a devil who then dumped him into hell. En only survived the journey into hell because he was so full of hate that he couldn't risk dying before exacting revenge. In Hell he survived by creating mushrooms to feed upon. Two years after being dumped to Hell, the devil Chidaruma found him and gave him the name 'En', then sent him back to the Sorcerers' world. A year and a half later he exacted his revenge, killing the factory workers, destroying the factory, and freeing all the captive Sorcerers. He and the survivors then formed a syndicate, from which his criminal empire grew.
  
 (Shin)
 (Noi)
En's enforcers or "cleaners". As partners, Shin and Noi are commonly shown competing with one another while on a job, placing bets on who can kill more people or kill a person faster.
Shin is one of the most powerful fighters. He fights with a hammer as a weapon and uses magic smoke that mutilates his victims without killing them. Shin's mask is shaped like a human heart which he usually wears backwards. Without the mask he is blond with blue eyes, and wears glasses. He is usually in a suit with an untucked white shirt and sneakers. He is actually half-Sorcerer, due to his father being human, and was born in the Hole. Shin's mother was killed by the local Hole militia not long after his birth. Initially unable to use magic, Shin was able to live life peacefully in the Hole with his father, with the two of them keeping his true nature a secret. However, an incident at the factory where they worked at exposed his true nature and led to his father's death at the hands of the militia. Shortly after, he met Dr. Kasukabe, who enabled him to use magic through surgery. Shin then took revenge on the militia by killing off several of their members, causing them to disband. Eventually, he made his way to the Sorcerer's world and was recruited by En as one of his enforcers.
Noi is a powerful cleaner for En's organization and is also En's younger cousin. She is heavily muscled and towering in height, with pale white-blond hair and red eyes—suggesting she might be albino. Her hair is mid length, and she has several piercings on her ears. Her smoke grants her the ability to heal herself and others of any injury. Despite being cousins, Noi and En's relationship is very strained, with Noi admitting to have never really liked En. In contrast, she is very affectionate to Shin, sometimes to his exasperation. Noi first met Shin in their adolescence, during which she was training to become a devil. Noi helped heal Shin's arms (which were rotten due to the crude procedure involved in enabling him to use magic), which drove Shin to try and find a way to repay her. A friendship between them developed, and during the final stage of her training, Shin was mortally injured in a fight while protecting Noi. Despite his objections, Noi used her magic to heal Shin, costing her chance at becoming a devil as result, a choice she does not regret. Noi's mask is very detailed, dark blue and apparently vinylic.

Fujita is a low-level who works for a company headed by En. His partner was killed by Caiman. He is assigned to find the Sorcerer who transformed Caiman into a saurian. A bit of research reveals a reptilian transformation specialist named Ebisu. Fujita recalls passing her while in the Hole, and so he manages to locate and save her just as she's stuck in the jaws of Caiman. The incident leaves Ebisu traumatized, and Fujita watches after her while waiting for her memory to return.
Fujita wears a trapper hat and a Tengu mask, and is known to cover his eyes during horror movies. His magic has yet to be defined, although he fired his smoke like bullets on one occasion.

Ebisu is sullen-looking teenage girl who wears a skull-shaped mask. While in the Hole, she runs into Caiman and Nikaido, who cuts off Ebisu's fingers to prevent her from using magic, and bites down on her head after removing her mask. Before he can withdraw to ask her his question, a frantic Fujita appears from a door behind her and forcefully pulls her out of his clamped-down jaws into the door, which results in the skin being torn off completely from her face. She is healed by Noi, but it is evident that her head trauma caused some brain damage, as seen in her suddenly eccentric behavior. She is commonly seen with Fujita, for whom she harbors reluctant affection.

Kikurage is a small, pink chimeric creature with the ability to revive dead Sorcerers. It was once controlled by Sorcerer who passed off its power as her own. En had planned to make her his partner, but upon discovering the deception, En turned her into mushrooms and adopted the creature. En named it "Kikurage", literally meaning Judas's Ear, due to its ears resembling Auricularia auricula-judae.
Kikurage is self-centered and only uses its powers when it feels like it. It is doted on by both En and Ebisu throughout the series. It is called Judas's Ear in the official Viz translation of the manga.

Turkey is a high level Sorcerer with the ability to create living dolls of people using food, which look exactly like the original. The doll will obey commands to do various tasks as they are usually mindless and obedient, but in some situations they won't, like in the case of Risu's doll.
The quality of the doll depends on the quality of the ingredients and spices used; if she uses terrible ingredients (e.g. human flesh) with no spices to make the doll, the doll may slowly fall apart overtime.

Chota is a muscular Sorcerer who wears an eyeless mask that resembles a bird's head. It is implied that he was once En's partner, but En despises Chota and kept him locked in a cage deep underground, accessible by an elevator only En himself knew about. Chota is desperate to be En's partner again, and so when En and Nikaido become partners, he develops a jealous, one-sided rivalry with Nikaido.
Chota's magic undoes the magic of other Sorcerers through a complicated ritual. He used it to heal Noi after Ebisu's smoke transformed her into a reptilian monster.

Matsumura was Fujita's sorcery partner. At the very beginning of the series, Caiman and Nikaido fight Fujita and Matsumura. After biting Matsumura's head and interrogating him, Caiman states that Matsumura is of no further use and murders him. Later, Kasukabe reanimates Matsumura's remains to make "Frankenstein", an electric-powered baseball player. Fujita tries to take Frankenstein to the Sorcerers' world to have Kikurage revive him, but Ebisu destroyed Frankenstein, mutilating Matsumura's remains beyond recognition.
Fujita was fiercely devoted to Matsumura, sparing nothing to see him revived, or to take revenge for his fallen partner. Fujita would also frequently visit Matsumura's empty grave to leave offerings and pay respects.
 /

The Cross-Eye Gang

Kai is the leader of the Cross-Eye Gang. Spurred on by Holey's influence, his true reason for forming the organization was to kill magic users and take their powers.

Tetsujo is the second-in-command of the Cross-Eyes, as well as Dokuga's best friend. He tends to act as the voice of reason within the group.

Natsuki is a new member of the Cross-Eye Gang. She first became acquainted with Caiman and Nikaido while they were escaping En's Manor. Her magic covers her body in a jelly-like coat that renders her incapable of harm. She is later killed by Kai and her devil tumor transplanted into his body.

Devils

The oldest and most powerful of the Devils, and the ruler of both Hell and the Sorcerer's world. A nigh-omnipotent being, Chidaruma is also the creator of the Sorcerers. In spite of his immense power and influence, he suffers from constant boredom, and thus seeks excitement and different ways to entertain himself.
 / 

Asu, real name Kawajiri, is a Devil, and close associate of Nikaido in the Sorcerer's world. He is later revealed to have once been Nikaido's adoptive elder brother. However, Nikaido, in her attempts to undo a tragic mistake in her youth with her magic, unintentionally altered the past which led them to live completely different lives. Nikaido is the only one to remember their former lives of the original timeline.

Others

Holey is the main antagonist of the series. He is a sapient collection of humans centuries-long resentment towards magic users. Holey tricks Ai Coleman into jumping into a sludge pit and uses his body to begin his vendetta. After obtained a physical form, he is greeted by Chidaruma before going on a killing spree against the magic users in Hole. He is opposed by a devil-turned Nikaido, only to use her time-traveling powers to save himself and kill her (although she later returns from the past and becomes human again). He eventually kills Nikaido again along with Asu before being confronted by Caiman, now a magic user. Caiman uses his Gyoza-baesd magic to deal heavy damage before decapitating Holey.

A stern, aggressive, but ultimately caring owner of a restaurant whom Caiman briefly works for upon his second visit to the Sorcerer's world.

A sorcerer who has a strong connection to Caiman's past, and is evidently linked to the man who resides in his mouth. Murdered three years before the start of the series at the hands of an unknown assailant, he is later resurrected by the En Family through Kikurage's power. Much like Caiman, he bears two cross marks tattooed on his eyes. He is currently in search of his enigmatic best friend, Aikawa, who was the last person he saw before his sudden death.

Media

Manga

Dorohedoro, written and illustrated by Q Hayashida, began in the first ever issue of Shogakukan's seinen manga magazine Spirits Zōkan Ikki (re-branded as Monthly Ikki in 2003), released on November 30, 2000. Monthly Ikki ceased publication on September 25, 2014, and the series was transferred to Monthly Ikkis magazine replacement Hibana, starting on March 6, 2015. Hibana ceased publication after a two-year run on August 7, 2017, and Dorohedoro was transferred to Shogakukan's shōnen manga magazine Monthly Shōnen Sunday on November 10 of the same year. The manga finished after 18 years of publication on September 12, 2018, with its 167th chapter. Shogakukan collected its chapters in 23 tankōbon volumes, released from January 30, 2002, to November 12, 2018. A 14-page special chapter was published 17 months after the series' finale in Monthly Shōnen Sunday on February 12, 2020.

In North America, Viz Media began distributing the manga digitally in 2009 when it launched its SigIKKI site, the former online English version of Monthly Ikki. Its 23 volumes were released in print from March 16, 2010, to September 17, 2019. The manga was translated by the localization company AltJapan Co., Ltd.

Anime

An anime television series adaptation of Dorohedoro was announced in the December 2018 issue of Shogakukan's Monthly Shōnen Sunday magazine released on November 12, 2018. The series is produced by MAPPA and directed by Yuichiro Hayashi, with series composition by Hiroshi Seko, character designs by Tomohiro Kishi, and music composed by R.O.N of (K)NoW_NAME. It ran for 12 episodes from January 12 to March 29, 2020 on Tokyo MX.<ref></p></ref> A series of six 5-minute-long episode original video animation (OVA) was bundled with the series' second Blu-ray release on June 17, 2020.

Dorohedoro was released outside of Japan on Netflix on May 28, 2020. The six short episodes were also made available on Netflix on October 15, 2020, as one long singular episode, labeled as episode 13.

Reception

Manga
Joseph Luster of Otaku USA called the series a "weird title", but he said that the story "makes for some prime manga absorption". He called the artwork "rough and sketchy, but painstakingly detailed", comparing it to the art style of Kentaro Miura and Pushead. Bill Sherman of Blogcritics praised Hayashida's writing and her bold artwork with her "in-your-face action and punkish scratchiness". David Brothers of ComicsAlliance praised Hayashida's Dorohedoro for her ability to find the beauty in the grotesque and compared the drawing to the likes of Simon Bisley, Tsutomu Nihei, and Katsuhiro Otomo. Brothers continues, "It's gritty, but it looks great. Flipping through the book just to gaze at the art is almost as rewarding as actually reading it". Deb Aoki of About.com wrote: "Dorohedoro is violent and surreal, but it's also infused with Hayashida's dark and goofy sense of humor. Between their killing sprees, Caiman and Nikaido bicker and flirt like workin' class stiffs who appreciate a laugh and a good meal after a hard day at the office". On the other hand, Carlo Santos from Anime News Network has criticized the series, saying that the story "never develops a sense of flow" and that Q Hayashida "cannot draw the human body at all".

Anime
The Dorohedoro anime series was nominated for the 2021 5th Crunchyroll Anime Awards. Lynzee Loveridge from Anime News Network praised the story, animation and characters, calling it "Dorohedoro somehow perfected the balance of mystery, absurd violence, and humor into a single hellishly beautiful package. The background artistry is a major highlight, especially the scenes around En's mansion and Sorcerer's world where highly detailed minutiae create something both beautiful and frightening. Absurdly funny, well-realized characters, a fleshed-out horrific world". Thrillist'''s Kambole Campbell wrote: "Dorohedoro'' hooks viewers with a wild premise and a unique, macabre world, but its staying power is in its cast of charming characters, as well as its numerous detours."

Notes

References

Further reading

External links
  
  
  
  
 
  at Netflix
 

2000 manga
2020 anime television series debuts
Anime series based on manga
Action anime and manga
Dark comedy anime and manga
Dark fantasy anime and manga
MAPPA
Netflix original anime
Post-apocalyptic anime and manga
Science fantasy anime and manga
Seinen manga
Shogakukan manga
Shōnen manga
Toho Animation
Tokyo MX original programming
Viz Media manga